Pristimantis buckleyi is a species of frog in the family Strabomantidae. It is found on the Andes of Colombia and Ecuador. Specifically, it occurs on the both flanks of the Cordillera Central and on the eastern flank of the Cordillera Occidental in Colombia, and on the Cordillera Real in Ecuador south Cayambe, at elevations of  asl.

Pristimantis buckleyi is named after Mr. Buckley, the collector of the type series from Intac, Imbabura Province of Ecuador.

Habitat
Pristimantis buckleyi is a common frog inhabiting primary and secondary forest and forest edges, sub-páramo bush land, páramo, open areas, and croplands.

Description
Males are smaller ( in snout–vent length) than females and have longer hind limbs. Colouration is variable but ranges from gray-tan to yellow-brown through darker browns to reddish brown or black. The dorsum has black flecks; the skin has low, flat warts. Tympanum is distinct.

References

buckleyi
Amphibians of the Andes
Amphibians of Colombia
Amphibians of Ecuador
Páramo fauna
Amphibians described in 1882
Taxonomy articles created by Polbot